The Tsou plot is a graphical method of determining the number and nature of the functional groups on an enzyme that are necessary for its catalytic activity.

Theory of Tsou's method 

Tsou Chen-Lu analysed the relationship between the functional groups of enzymes that are necessary for their biological activity and the loss of activity that occurs when the enzyme is treated with an irreversible inhibitor. The fraction  of activity remaining after modification of  groups per molecule must be

and so

This means that a plot of   against  should be a straight line.

There are various complications with this analysis, as discussed in the original paper, and, more recently in a textbook.

Experimental applications 

Despite the possible objections, the Tsou plot gave clear results when applied by Paterson and Knowles to inactivation of pepsin by trimethyloxonium tetrafluoroborate (Meerwein's reagent), a reagent that modifies carboxyl residues in proteins. They were able to deduce from this experiment that three non-essential groups are modified without loss of activity, followed by two essential groups — two because assuming   yielded a straight line in the plot, whereas values of 1 and 3 yielded curves, with a total of 13 residues modified, as illustrated in the figure.

Tsou's plot has also given good results with other systems, such the type I dehydroquinase from Salmonella typhi, for which modification of just one essential group by diethyl pyrocarbonate was sufficient to inactivate the enzyme.

Alternative approach to the same question

A little before Tsou published his paper William Ray and Daniel Koshland had described a different way of investigating the number and nature of  groups on an enzyme essential for activity. Their method depends on kinetic measurements, and cannot be used, therefore, in cases where the modification is too fast for such measurements, such as the case of pepsin discussed above, but it complements Tsou's approach in useful ways.

Suppose that an enzyme has two groups  and  that are both essential for the catalytic activity, so if either is lost the catalytic activity is also lost.

The equation can be extended in an obvious way to the case more than two groups are essential. Ray and Koshland also described the properties to be observed when not all of the modified groups are essential.

References

Plots (graphics)
Enzyme kinetics